Huáng bǎi (黃栢 or 黃栢, literally "yellow fir"), huáng bó (黃柏) or huáng bò (黃檗) is one of the fifty fundamental herbs of traditional Chinese medicine.  Known also as Cortex Phellodendri, it is the bark of one of two species of Phellodendron tree: Phellodendron amurense or Phellodendron chinense.

Cultivation 
For Phellodendron amurense (关黄柏, i.e. "highland Phellodendron") one of the major producing areas is Taoshan District of Heilongjiang province, though other regions of Heilongjiang, Jilin, Liaoning and Inner Mongolia may also be suitable.  These provinces are in the far northeast of China, near the Heilong Jiang river, known in Russian as the Аму́р (Amur River), and Phellodendron amurense is commonly known as the Amur cork tree.

Phellodendron chinense (川黄柏, i.e. "lowland Phellodendron") producing areas include Sichuan, Hubei, Guizhou, Yunnan, and Guangxi.

Preparation 
Bark is collected during Qingming (Pure Brightness), the fifth solar term (April 4–20).  It is sun-dried and cut into slices.  The bark may be used raw or fried with salt.  Typical dosage is 3–10 grams.  A variety of methods of water and ethanol extraction may have differing activities (see below) and methods such as "semi-bionic extraction" have been investigated to improve yields.  Some pharmacological activities of the bark can be standardized by analyzing the level of berberine using a monoclonal antibody, thin-layer chromatography, HPLC, potentiometry, or acidic potassium permanganate chemiluminescence.  There are quantitative differences between the two species of Cortex Phellodendri (P. amurense and chinense) and it has been suggested that they should be used as separate resources in the clinic.  An analysis of 31 commercial samples in 1993 found that the total level of five alkaloids in samples of P. wilsonii and P. amurense var. sachalinense was 4.1% (mostly berberine), while the level in P. amurense and Ph. chinense was 1.5%.

The levels of four harmful trace heavy metals (arsenic, cadmium, mercury, and thallium) in P. chinense for export are limited by the Pharmacopoeia of the People's Republic of China and the Green Trade Standard for Importing and Exporting Medicinal Plant and Preparation.

History 
The earliest known writings about this preparation are found in the Shennong ben cao jing

Traditional attributes 
The bark is categorized in a traditional Chinese medicine counterpart of humorism, Wu Xing, as bitter and cold, affecting the kidney, urinary bladder and large intestine meridians.  Is said "to clear heat and dry dampness", and "to reduce fire and release toxins".

Biochemical analysis 
Small molecules found in the bark include:
berberine and oxyberberine
caffeic acid ethyl ester
isovanillin
ferulic acid
(+/-)-5,5'-dimethoxylariciresinol
methyl beta-orsellinate
obacunone
limonin and 12alpha-hydroxylimonin
nomilin
gamma-fagarine
canthin-6-one
4-methoxy-N-methyl-2-quinolone
palmatine and oxypalmatine
(+/-)-lyoniresinol
β-sitosterol
stigmasterine
amurenlactone A
amurenamide A
phellodensins and phellodenols
(2R)-sodium 3-phenyllactate
jatrorrhizine
an isocoumarin, 3-acetyl-3,4-dihydro-5,6-dimethoxy-1H-2-benzopyran-1-one
Ala-Pro-Trp-Cys, a glutathione S-transferase activating peptide

References

External links 
黃檗 description in Li Shizhen's 1578 materia medica, the Bencao Gangmu (Wikisource: Chinese) autotranslate
黄柏 entry on Hudong (Chinese) autotranslate

Plants used in traditional Chinese medicine